The Colombia national football team represents Colombia in men's international football and is managed by the Colombian Football Federation, the governing body for football in Colombia. They are a member of CONMEBOL and are currently ranked 17th in the FIFA World Rankings. The team are nicknamed Los Cafeteros due to the coffee production in their country. Notably, the national team has been a symbol of nationalism, pride, and passion for many Colombians worldwide. Colombia is known for having a passionate fan base, and the team's dances during goal celebrations have been symbolic.

The Colombian team has participated in six World Cups (1962, 1990, 1994, 1998, 2014 and 2018). In the 2014 edition held in Brazil, the team achieved its best World Cup performance, reaching the quarter-finals and coming fifth in the final standings. Its greatest international achievement is winning the Copa América in 2001 as hosts, also setting a new record with no goals conceded and every match won; it has also finished runner-up in 1975 and finished third five times: in 1987, 1993, 1995, 2016, and 2021. Furthermore, the team managed to make outstanding appearances at the continental level, obtaining from the Central American and Caribbean Games the gold and bronze medals in 1946 and 1938 respectively, and in the Bolivarian Games the team obtained the gold medal in 1951 and the silver medal in 1961, 1973 and 1981.

Colombia had its strongest period during the 1990s. A 1993 match which resulted in a 5–0 win over Argentina began a special "mutual respect" rivalry between both nations. The goalkeeper René Higuita achieved fame from his eccentric scorpion kick clearance against England at Wembley Stadium in 1995. Stars from Colombia's team playing in top European leagues included Carlos Valderrama, who shined in Ligue 1, Faustino Asprilla, who shined in the Serie A and Premier League, and Freddy Rincón, who played in Serie A, La Liga, and the Brazilian Championship. During this era Colombia qualified for 1990, 1994, and 1998 World Cups, only reaching the second round in 1990. Following the murder of Andrés Escobar after the 1994 World Cup, Colombia's performances faded in the latter half of the 1990s and early half of the 2000s, and although Colombia was the champion of the 2001 Copa América, which they hosted, the nation missed three World Cups between 2002 and 2010. Colombia was the first team to win FIFA best mover in 1993 where the achievement was first introduced and the second team after Croatia to win it twice in 2012.

A new era began for Colombia with the arrival of Argentine manager José Pékerman in January 2012. During the 2014 World Cup qualifiers, Colombia showed improvement over the 2011 Copa América, bringing its rank up from 40th to the top ten for the first time since 2002 and into the top five consistently for the first time since 2004. After a 16-year-long wait, in 2014 Colombia finally returned to the World Cup, where they were able to advance to the quarter-finals, the furthest Colombia has ever made it in a World Cup. Colombia's star midfielder James Rodríguez won two awards that tournament, the Golden Boot for most goals (6) and Best Goal of the Tournament, his long-range strike against Uruguay.

History

Early years, Argentine influence and maiden World Cup debut
The development of football in Colombia is debated by many. Most historians agree that the Caribbean Region was the place where football spread. It is believed that its origins go back to 1900, by English railway engineers from The Colombia Railways Company. It was not until 1924 that the Colombian Football Federation was formed, initially under the name Liga de Fútbol, that gained the affiliation with FIFA and CONMEBOL in 1936. Colombia played its first international match on 17 February 1926 against Costa Rica at the Julio Torres Stadium in Barranquilla, obtaining a 4–1 victory against the Central Americans.

In 1937, Colombia formed a national team for the Juegos del IV Centenario de Cali (Games of the IV Centenary of Cali). Colombia played four matches at the recently opened Estadio Olímpico Pascual Guerrero: against Mexico (3–1), Argentina (1–3), Ecuador (5–0), and Cuba (1–3). Despite becoming a FIFA member in 1936, Colombia withdrew from the 1938 World Cup in France. Instead, Colombia played at the 1938 Central American and Caribbean Games. The Colombia national football team was composed mostly by all the players of the Club Juventud Bogotana (now Millonarios). Alfonso Novoa was the manager of Colombia until 23 February. The first game was played on 10 February 1938 against Mexico. Colombia was defeated 1–3; Luis Argüelles, Luis de la Fuente and Horacio Casarín scored for Mexico, while Marcos Mejía scored for Colombia. Colombia was able to obtain the bronze medal, with two wins and three losses. The same year, Colombia played at the I Bolivarian Games in Bogotá, where they finished fourth with one win and three losses. Fernando Paternoster was the manager of Colombia, the side's first foreign manager.

Colombia did not play again until 1945 when they participated for the first time at the South American Championship, finishing in fifth place. This time, Colombia was composed by players of Junior de Barranquilla except for Antonio de la Hoz (who played for Sporting de Barranquilla) and Pedro Ricardo López (who played for Boca Juniors de Cali). Roberto Meléndez was player and coach of Colombia throughout the tournament. Despite Colombia's debut at the tournament, the country withdrew from the 46' edition. Instead, Colombia participated at the 1946 Central American and Caribbean Games in Barranquilla. There they won the gold medal-winning all six matches, scoring 20 goals and conceding 7 goals. The manager of Colombia during the year was the Peruvian José Arana Cruz. The following year, Colombia played at the 1947 South American Championship in Ecuador. The team was 8th, being the worst team of the tournament with just two draws obtained against Ecuador and Bolivia, and five defeats, scoring only 2 goals. The two goal scorers for Colombia at the tournament were Carlos Arango, who scored in Colombia's 1–5 loss against Peru, and Rafael Granados who scored against Chile in Colombia's last fixture which they lost 1–4. The manager, Argentine Lino Taioli, was sacked just after the tournament ended.

The first match of Colombia in the professional era was played on 6 April in the 1949 South American Championship, a 3–0 defeat against Paraguay. Austrian coach Friedrich Donenfeld was the manager of Colombia during the tournament; he had moved with his family to Colombia due to World War II, and Atlético Junior would be his first team as a coach. As Junior was chosen to represent Colombia in the tournament, he became in the first European manager of the Colombia national team. The team, however, repeated their losing streak since, as in the previous tournament, ended eighth with two draws and five losses, scoring four goals. Colombia chose to not enter the qualification process for the 1950 FIFA World Cup held in Brazil and also withdrew from the South American Championship in 1953. For the following World Cup in 1954, Colombia was banned from participating due to the controversial El Dorado era which witnessed the Colombia football league's breaking away from FIFA. Colombia would also withdraw from the 1955 and 1956 editions of the South American Championship. For the 1957 South American Championship in Peru the manager was Pedro López, who was player of the national team between 1938 and 1945. Colombia was fifth, with two wins and four losses. In this tournament, Colombia suffered which is so far its biggest defeat, a 9–0 against Brazil. The most outstanding players of Colombia during the tournament players were the goalkeeper Efraín Sánchez and the forwards Carlos Arango and Delio Gamboa, both with three goals scored. After a withdrawal in 1938 and getting banned in 1954, Colombia participated for the first time in qualifying for the 1958 FIFA World Cup in Sweden with Rodolfo Orlandini as manager. Their first match was on 16 June 1957 against Uruguay in Bogotá, which ended in a 1–1 draw. Colombia lost their next matches, leaving them at the bottom of the group.

Under Argentine coach Adolfo Pedernera, Colombia qualified for the 1962 World Cup, its first-ever FIFA World Cup by eliminating Peru. The first match was played in Bogotá and ended 1–0 in favour of Colombia with a goal from Eusebio Escobar. For the following game in Lima, Peru managed to tie on aggregate with the help of a penalty in the third minute of the match, however, Héctor González scored in the 68th minute of the second half to help Colombia finish 2–1 on aggregate.

At the 1962 World Cup, Colombia was drawn into a tough group containing Uruguay, Soviet Union and Yugoslavia; both had achieved notable results comparing to Colombia. Colombia lost its first match, 2–1 against Uruguay. Luis Cubilla and Jorge Sasía scored for Uruguay at the 56th and 75th minute respectively, while Francisco Zuluaga scored a 19th-minute penalty goal for Colombia to give the Colombians their first-ever World Cup goal and a shock lead. In the second match, they earned a 4–4 draw with the USSR, champions of the 1960 European Nations' Cup. In this game, Colombia scored four goals against Soviet goalkeeper Lev Yashin, widely considered the best goalkeeper in football history. Also in that game, América de Cali midfielder Marcos Coll scored the only olympic goal in World Cup history so far. Unfortunately, the Colombian campaign in 1962 ended with a 5–0 defeat against Yugoslavia, who finished in fourth place in the tournament. After the 1962 World Cup, Colombia didn't qualify for over 28 years before they returned in the 1990 edition.

First Copa América final and unsuccessful World Cup qualification campaigns (1963–1979)
After withdrawing the two editions of the South American Championship in Argentina and Ecuador, Colombia participated in the 1963 South American Championship in Bolivia. Colombia finished last in the tournament with a draw and five defeats. Delio Gamboa was the goalscorer of Colombia with three goals. For the 1966 FIFA World Cup qualifiers, Colombia was placed in a group against Ecuador and Chile. The team finished in the bottom of their group with 2 points, only with a 2–0 win over Chile in Bogotá. The following year, Colombia had to play qualifying for the 1967 South American Championship against Chile, but was eliminated with a 5–2 defeat in Santiago and a 0–0 draw in Bogotá.

Colombia participated for qualifying for the 1970 FIFA World Cup in Group 2, with Brazil, Paraguay and Venezuela. The team finished 3rd with one win, one draw and four defeats. In 1970, before the start of the World Cup in Mexico, England prepared a friendly against Colombia to prepare the team for the high altitudes of Mexico. England beat Colombia 4–0, but their victory was overshadowed by the Bogotá Bracelet incident. For the 1974 FIFA World Cup qualifiers, Colombia faced Uruguay and Ecuador. Colombia was able to obtain a win and three draws, tied on 5 points with Uruguay, but Uruguay would be the one who qualified to the next stage due to better goal difference.

At the 1975 Copa America, the team was under the orders of former Colombia national team player Efraín Sánchez. Colombia was placed in Group C with Paraguay and Ecuador. Colombia won all four games with 7 goals for and 1 against, advancing to the semifinals against Uruguay. Colombia won 3–0 at home and lost 1–0 away, but the 3–1 aggregate score allowed them to advance to the final for the first time in their history, where they faced Peru. Colombia won at home 1–0, but lost 2–0 away, so that the champion was defined on neutral ground (in Caracas) where Peru beat Colombia with a 25th-minute goal from Hugo Sotil. Colombian Ernesto Díaz tied with Argentinian Leopoldo Luque as the top goalscorer of the tournament with 4 goals.

Yugoslav Blagoje Vidinić, who notably won the 1974 African Cup of Nations with Zaire (now known as DR Congo), was Colombia's coach during the qualification process for the 1978 FIFA World Cup in Argentina. Colombia shared Group 1 with Brazil and Paraguay and failed to qualify after finishing last with just two points. Eduardo Vilarete was Colombia's sole goalscorer throughout the qualifiers with a goal against Paraguay. Although failing to qualify for the World Cup, Vidinić continued as coach as Colombia disputed the 1979 Copa América, where they shared Group A with Chile and Venezuela. Despite finishing with the same points as first-placed Chile, Colombia were knocked out of the tournament due to goal difference.

1980s: dawn of the Golden Generation and World Cup qualification
Prior to the 1980s, the Colombia national football team was widely recognized as a weak team, and lack of fans, due to neglected investment for the national team by the Colombian Football Federation, national tragedies like La Violencia, and widespread criminal activities that destabilized the country. Their lack of participation also added to this sporadic support, and despite having qualified for the 1962 FIFA World Cup, the national team remained underrated and under-achieved than the rest of South America, particularly to those of Chile, Peru, Bolivia and Paraguay outside traditional powers Uruguay, Brazil and Argentina, in spite of their youth football successes.

During the 1982 FIFA World Cup qualifiers, Colombia was under the command of Argentine manager Carlos Bilardo, who later won the World Cup with Argentina in 1986. Colombia was drawn into Group 2 with Peru and Uruguay with the first-placed team earning direct qualification. Colombia started off their qualification campaign with a 1–1 draw at home against Peru. Colombia played away against Uruguay for the second match, where they suffered a 3–2 defeat. For their next match, Colombia's hopes of qualifying were diminished after suffering a 2–0 away defeat to Peru. Lastly, Colombia ended the qualification campaign with a 1–1 draw at home against Uruguay. Ultimately, Colombia finished last behind Uruguay and first-placed Peru with just 2 points. As a result, Bilardo was fired from his position as coach, eventually being replaced by Efraín Sánchez.

Former national team player Efraín Sánchez coached Colombia during the 1983 Copa América. The team shared Group C with Peru and Bolivia and started the tournament with a 1–0 win against Bolivia with a goal from forward Alex Valderrama, also known as Didi. Colombia would tie the following two games against Peru and Bolivia, respectively, thus failing to qualify to the next round after finishing second behind Peru with two less points. Didi was Colombia's top scorer at the tournament, scoring in both of Colombia's matches against Bolivia. Under the orders of Gabriel Ochoa Uribe, Colombia was drawn into Group 1 for the 1986 FIFA World Cup qualifiers along with Argentina, Peru, and Venezuela. The team began their qualification campaign with a 1–0 win against Peru with a goal from Miguel Prince. However, Colombia suffered a 1–3 home defeat to Argentina for the following fixture. Despite tying with Peru in the third fixture, Colombia fell 1–0 away to Argentina. Notably, Colombia recovered with a 2–2 tie and a 2–0 win against Venezuela. Colombia ultimately qualified for the play-offs against Paraguay, however, the team failed to qualify after losing 2–4 on aggregate.

In anticipation for the 1987 Copa América, Francisco Maturana was hired as Colombia's coach. Placed in Group C with Bolivia and Paraguay, Colombia began their tournament with a 2–0 over Bolivia. Their next game against Paraguay ended 3–0 for Colombia, owing to a hat-trick from Arnoldo Iguarán. Colombia faced Chile in the semi-finals, a match which extended itself in extra-time following a 0–0 draw after regular time. Colombia would score in the 103rd minute following a penalty-kick goal from Bernardo Redín. However, Chile would ultimately score two goals to eliminate Colombia. Despite this, they won the third-place match against recent World Cup winners Argentina to finish in the top three for the first time in their history. Additionally, Iguarán won the tournament's top-scorer award with four goals and Carlos Valderrama won the best player award for his nifty performances throughout the tournament.

For the 1990 World Cup qualifiers, South America was allocated three-and-a-half berths at the 1990 finals. The continent's nine remaining sides were split into three groups with the two automatic qualifying berths going to the two best group winners, in this instance Uruguay and Brazil. The group winner with the worst record would advance to the CONMEBOL–OFC play-off. Thus, Colombia had to take on the winners of the Oceania zone. Curiously, this turned out to be Israel, after they finished ahead of Australia and New Zealand in the final qualifying group. Colombia qualified for their first FIFA World Cup since Chile 1962 after winning in Barranquilla 1–0, and tying in Ramat Gan 0–0, with most of the players coming from Atlético Nacional, who Maturana was also managing at the time.

1990s: World Cup return, and the first Colombian Golden Era

At the 1990 World Cup, Colombia was once again drawn with the Yugoslavs, alongside United Arab Emirates and powerhouse West Germany. Colombia faced the United Arab Emirates at the Stadio Renato Dall'Ara in Bologna, where they won 2–0 with goals from Bernardo Redín and Carlos Valderrama to achieve Colombia's first-ever win at the World Cup finals. Although losing their second game against Yugoslavia 1–0, Colombia achieved qualification to the round of 16 after a historic 1–1 draw with eventual champions West Germany, where Freddy Rincón equalized the game for Colombia in the 93rd minute succeeding West Germany's initial goal in the 88th minute from Pierre Littbarski. Thus, Colombia finished the group-stage in third place with 3 points which managed to place them second amongst the third-placed teams. However, Colombia would be eliminated in their next match against Cameroon with a 2–1 defeat in extra time, a match which is remembered for a mistake from Colombian goalkeeper René Higuita and Cameroonian star Roger Milla's iconic goal celebration which was a product of Higuita's mistake. Bernardo Redín led Colombia in goal-scoring with two goals against United Arab Emirates and Cameroon. Shortly after this defeat, Maturana left his post as Colombia manager. However, this World Cup appearance marked the rise of a generation known as the first Colombian Golden Generation.

For the 1991 Copa América, coach Luis Augusto García took charge of the Colombian national team. The squad included a consistent foundation of players which included stars such as Andrés Escobar, Luis Carlos Perea, Leonel Álvarez, Freddy Rincón, René Higuita, and captain Carlos Valderrama, amongst others. The team was drawn into Group B, composed of Ecuador, Bolivia, Brazil, and Uruguay. The team started off with a 1–0 win against Ecuador with a goal from Antony de Ávila. The following game, Colombia drew against Bolivia. Notably, the team triumphed over Brazil in a 2–0 win with goals from de Ávila and Iguarán, respectively. Despite losing their last game against Uruguay, Colombia topped the group with 5 points with a superior goal difference to Brazil and Uruguay, who shared the same amount of points. Despite an impressive run in the first round, Colombia ended last in the group for the final round after drawing once and losing twice. For this reason, Colombia finished fourth with de Ávila finishing as the team's top scorer at the tournament with three goals; Argentina were ultimately crowned as champions.

Shortly before the 1993 Copa América in Ecuador, Maturana returned for his second spell as Colombia manager; Colombia's captain during the tournament was Carlos Valderrama. Colombia began their tournament campaign by topping their group undefeated. In the first match, the team beat Mexico 2–1 with goals from Adolfo Valencia and Víctor Aristizábal. Colombia drew their next two games against Bolivia and Argentina. Despite sharing the same points as Argentina, Colombia finished first due to superior goal difference. In the quarter-finals, they beat Uruguay on penalties, and lost to eventual winners Argentina in the semi-finals on penalties, but won the third place match against Ecuador to finish third for the second time in their history. Freddy Rincón finished as Colombia's top scorer with two goals against Argentina in the first round and against Ecuador in the third-place match.

Along with achieving qualification to the 1994 World Cup, Colombia finished top of their qualifying group without having lost a match, which included a historic 0–5 victory over Argentina in Buenos Aires. Curiously, a few days before the crucial match, Diego Maradona launched a phrase during a television interview: while putting palms of the hands parallel to the ground at chest height, one above the other, said "You can't change history, history shouldn't be changed: Argentina up, Colombia down." Expectations of the team were high, some even naming them as favorites to win the tournament, as they had only lost one official match from July 1992 going into the World Cup. Colombia was assigned to Group A with the hosts United States, Romania, and Switzerland. During the tournament, the internal conflict within Colombia proved to be detrimental and harmful for the Colombian squad as the team was distracted from their main goal. Colombia only earned one win over Switzerland and suffered two losses, which would eliminate them in the first phase. The first match against Romania ended with a 3–1 defeat which notoriously angered Colombian drug cartels who had previously bet money on Colombia to win the match, which resulted in various death threats made to relatives of the Colombian players and manager Maturana. During the match against the United States, an unwanted incident occurred, when Andrés Escobar scored an own goal, leading to Colombia's elimination as they lost 2–1. Escobar was later murdered in Colombia a few days after the own goal, and this traumatic incident would lead to the demise of Colombia's first Golden Generation.

Hernán Darío Gómez was in charge of the national squad for the Copa América that followed in Uruguay in 1995. As with the last tournament, Carlos Valderrama was appointed as captain for his country. In the opening match, Colombia drew 1–1 against Peru with goals from Faustino Asprilla and Peruvian Roberto Palacios. Colombia won their following match against Ecuador with Rincón providing the sole goal. However, the team lost 3–0 against Brazil in the closing game. Despite the loss, Colombia qualified for the quarter-finals after finishing second behind Brazil. The team beat Paraguay in the quarter-finals in a penalty shoot-out which ended 5–4 after a 1–1 draw; Colombia eventually fell against Uruguay in the semi-finals. Conclusively, the team achieved a third-place finish after beating the United States 4–1 for the third-place match.

Colombia were placed with in Group C with Brazil, Mexico, and Costa Rica for 1997 Copa América in Bolivia on the direction of coach Maturana. The squad lost against Mexico 1–2 to start the competition. In the subsequent game against Costa Rica, which Colombia won 4–1, they improved. Colombia qualified with a third-place finish despite losing their most recent game against Brazil. However, they were defeated by the host Bolivia in the quarterfinals, which brought their tournament to an end. Néider Morantes led Colombia in scoring during the competition with two goals against Costa Rica.

Under the command of Hernán Darío Gómez, Colombia ended with 28 points at the end of the qualifying round for the 1998 FIFA World Cup in France. Colombia finished in third position, two points behind Argentina, who had 30 points. Group G was given to Colombia, Tunisia, England, and once more, Romania. Similar to the 1994 version, Romania won the opening game 1–0 with a goal from Valencia forward Adrian Ilie. Furthermore, Léider Preciado's goal in the 82nd minute gave Colombia a 1–0 victory over Tunisia in the team's second game. In order to advance to the next round, Colombia needed to win their last game against England, however, The Three Lions defeated Colombia 2–0 with goals from midfielder Darren Anderton and a young David Beckham who scored his first goal for England from a free kick, thus ending Colombia's tournament hopes. Ultimately, Colombia finished third in their group behind Romania and England, thus concluding their last World Cup appearance until the 2014 edition.

Coach Javier lvarez Arteaga oversaw Colombia's participation at the 1999 Copa América in Paraguay. The team was placed in a challenging group with Argentina, Uruguay, and Ecuador. Víctor Bonilla's lone goal gave his squad a 1–0 victory over Uruguay to kick off the competition. Colombia defeated Argentina 3–0 in their subsequent encounter thanks to goals from Iván Córdoba, Edwin Congo, and Johnnier Montaño. Argentine player Martin Palermo's performance in the game, in which he notoriously missed three consecutive penalties, also left a lasting impression. For the last group-stage match against Ecuador, Néider Morantes and Middlesbrough F.C. forward Hámilton Ricard provided Colombia with two goals to beat Ecuador 2–1. The squad finished first in their group after winning all of their games. However, the team's tournament fell short after a 3–2 loss against Chile in the quarter-finals. This time, Colombia's top scorer at the tournament was Víctor Bonilla with two goals against Chile and Uruguay, respectively.

Early 2000s: First Copa América title and temporary decline (2000–2010)
Prior to the Copa América to be hosted in Colombia in 2001, the national team was invited to participate in their first 2000 CONCACAF Gold Cup hosted in the United States, with the team under the orders of manager Luis Augusto García, also known in Colombia as "El Chiqui". Furthermore, Colombia were put into Group A alongside Jamaica and Honduras. Colombia began their tournament against Jamaica, achieving a 1–0 win against the Reggae Boyz with a goal from Gonzalo Martínez. Against Honduras, the team lost 2–0, however, Colombia still managed to qualify to the next round thanks to Honduras having beat Jamaica two days before. For the quarter-finals, Colombia squared up against Group B winner and host United States, who had won both of previous their games against Haiti and Peru, respectively. During the game, the United States would score first with a 20th-minute goal from Brian McBride, but Colombia quickly tied four minutes later owing to Faustino Asprilla, thus concluding the first half. The United States would start off the second-half with an early goal from Chris Armas, and when things looked to be in favour for the U.S., Gerardo Bedoya tied the game with nine minutes to spare. Following a draw in extra-time, Colombia eliminated the United States on penalties 2–1, after goalkeeper Miguel Calero denied Ben Olsen's crucial penalty kick. For the semi-finals, the team beat Peru 2–1 and would match up against Canada in the final, however, Colombia failed to lift the trophy after losing 2–0 with goals from Jason de Vos and Carlo Corazzin.

Manager Fransico Maturna returned to the national team for the 2001 Copa América, which was the first Copa América held in Colombia. Prior to the tournament, meetings were held by CONMEBOL authorities who were concerned about potential security issues in Colombia, and the tournament was canceled on 1 July, just ten days before the opening match. On 6 July, CONMEBOL decided to reinstate the tournament, which was held on schedule. Canada had already disbanded its training camp and released its players, so Costa Rica (a CONCACAF invitee) was invited to the tournament. The Argentine Football Association (AFA) decided to withdraw from the competition on July 10 despite Colombian authorities' proposal to take additional safety precautions. Supposedly, AFA had complained about the abrupt change and claimed that Argentine players had received death threats from terrorist groups. CONCACAF affiliated Honduras were invited, and they arrived on July 13 aboard an aeroplane provided by the Colombian Air Force, after the tournament had already begun and just a few hours before its opening match, with hardly enough players.

For the group stage, Colombia shared Group A with Chile, Ecuador, and Venezuela. On 11 July, Colombia began the tournament with a 2–0 victory against Venezuela in at the Estadio Metropolitano of Barranquilla, a location that would serve as Colombia's home field throughout the group stage; Freddy Grisales and Víctor Aristizábal were the goal scorers for the home side. The following match against Ecuador ended in a 1–0 victory for Colombia, with Aristizábal providing the crucial goal. For their last fixture, Colombia defeated Chile 2–0 with goals from Aristizábal, and Eudalio Arriaga. Thus, Colombia topped their group with a perfect win-rate with a plus five difference and no goals conceded. They eliminated Peru in the quarter-finals with a brace from Aristizábal and an additional goal from Giovanni Hernández. For the semi-finals, Colombia faced the dark-horses of the tournament, Honduras, where Colombia prevailed 2–0 thanks to goals from Bedoya and another goal from Aristizábal, which marked his sixth and final goal of the tournament. Colombia won their first Copa América title by defeating Mexico, another CONCACAF invitee, in the final with a goal from captain Iván Córdoba in the second half. The team also broke a Copa America record of not conceding any goals and winning every game. Additionally, Aristizábal finished as the tournament's top scorer, with six goals, and the team won the fair play award as well. Consequently, the title qualified the team for the 2003 FIFA Confederations Cup in France. There were no terrorist incidents throughout the competition.

For the 2002 World Cup, Colombia only managed to place sixth in the qualification round, tied with Uruguay but failing to qualify due to goal difference. This was the first time that Colombia had failed to qualify for a World Cup since the team's three consecutive qualifications that began in 1990. As a result, Maturana left his post as Colombia manager which still remains as his last stint with Colombia. Despite failure, the team did end up playing an international FIFA tournament the following year as representatives of CONMEBOL at the Confederations Cup. Colombia hired manager Reinaldo Rueda to overlook the team's participation. The team was put into Group A alongside Euro 2000 champions and hosts France, 2000 AFC Asian Cup champions Japan, and winners of the 2002 OFC Nations Cup, New Zealand. In their opening game against France, Colombia lost 1–0 following a sole goal product of a penalty scored by Thierry Henry. Colombia obtained a crucial victory against New Zealand, match in which Colombia was trailing 0–1 at half-time, but came back to win 3–1 in the second half. In Colombia's final Group A fixture, they beat Japan 1–0 with 68th-minute goal from Giovanni Hernández, who had scored Colombia's final goal in their previous fixture against New Zealand. Subsequently, the team finished the group-stage second behind France and qualified for the semi-finals, where they lost 1–0 against Cameroon. The team would end up disputing the third-place play-off against Turkey, where they lost 1–2; Hernández scored Colombia's only goal. Overall, Colombia placed fourth at the tournament with Hernández leading Colombia in goal-scoring with three goals, one shy from the eventual Golden Boot winner and champion with France, Thierry Henry.

Although the Colombian Golden Generation was exhibiting its declining years for the Colombian squad, the country had an acceptable performance at the 2004 Copa América under Reinaldo Rueda, beginning by topping their group. The team eliminated Costa Rica in the quarter-finals and then lost to Argentina in the semi-finals. They ended up earning fourth place after losing the third place match. Colombia also participated in the 2005 Gold Cup. The team performed poorly in the group stage, placing third with one win, and two losses. Even though it qualified to the next round as the best third-placed team and beat defending champions Mexico in the quarter-finals, the team was eventually eliminated by Panama, who Colombia had already lost to in the group stage. Prior to the tournament, expectations were high for Colombia, with the team considered as tournament favourites, which also marked a false reality after not making the final.

For the 2006 FIFA World Cup qualifiers, Reinaldo Rueda would continue as manager. Colombia was ultimately unsuccessful in their campaign, missing out by a single point due to Uruguay's win over Argentina for the final fixture. Had Uruguay and Argentina drawn, Colombia would've qualified to the playoff spot with their 1–0 away win over Paraguay, and they had superior goal difference to Uruguay as well. Consequently, Rueda left the national team on 12 October, and was eventually replaced by Jorge Luis Pinto on 1 January 2007. The following year, Colombia had one of its worst ever Copa América performances in the 2007 Copa América. The team finished third in the group with just one win against the United States and two losses, including a 5–0 loss to Paraguay, which wasn't enough to qualify for the knockout stages. Colombia ended the decade with an unsuccessful 2010 World Cup qualifying campaign, where the team experienced a similar situation to their previous qualification campaign and failed to qualify by a point despite winning their final match against Paraguay. Thus, Colombia had failed to qualify for the World Cup for the third time a row. These failures to qualify for the World Cup were mainly a result of constantly changing formations and a dysfunctional rotation of mangers which saw Pinto replaced by Eduardo Lara after a 4–0 loss to Chile, combined with the struggle to score goals in the last games of the qualification.

The Pékerman Era: revival and a new Golden Generation (2011–2018) 
In June 2011, Colombia has its worst ranking ever: 54th. Despite this ranking, In the 2011 Copa América, Colombia made a good run, topping their group and achieving a draw to the host nation Argentina, who were the favorites. In the next round, Colombia would be eliminated in a 2–0 loss against Peru in extra time. Los Cafeteros ended the year 2011 36th in the FIFA Rankings.

In September 2011, the Colombian side gained Leonel Álvarez as the new coach following the resignation of Hernán Darío Gómez, but he was sacked after three games with disappointing results, which led to the hiring of José Pékerman in January 2012. Pékerman's first match was a 2–0 win over Mexico in Miami, and his first official match was a 1–0 victory against Peru in June. In October 2012, Colombia moved back into the top 10 of the FIFA Rankings for the first time since July 2002, after the wins against Chile (3–1) and Uruguay (4–0). The team climbed to 9th place, up 13 places. At the end of the year, the team were in 5th.

Under Pékerman, the squad would break a personal qualifying best record by finishing in second with 30 points, and raise their FIFA ranking consistently into the top ten, which allowed them to qualify for the World Cup for the first time in 16 years. The qualification was secured with a 3–3 draw against Chile, after having trailed 0–3 at the half. Although World Cup qualification was already secured, Colombia ended their qualifying campaign with a 2–1 victory against Paraguay in Asunción, with two goals from captain and defender Mario Yepes. Celebrations broke throughout the nation, as many neutrals hailed Colombia as a dark-horse towards being a World Cup contender. Often, Colombia were noted by many Colombian figures such as Carlos Valderrama as a team that could become the most successful Colombian squad in history. Throughout the qualification process, Colombia only conceded 12 goals, which was the second-best defensive record behind Argentina.

Colombia topped off their return in the 2014 World Cup after a 16-year absence by defeating Greece 3–0. Colombia then edged a 2–1 victory over the Ivory Coast to dispute Group C's top spot days later. On the same day, Japan and Greece drew 0–0 and automatically qualified Colombia to the round of 16 for the first time in 24 years since the 1990 World Cup. In its final group stage game, Colombia defeated Japan 4–1 to win Group C and become the third South American team (following Brazil and Argentina) to win all three group stage games in World Cup history. The Japan match also saw goalkeeper Faryd Mondragón, the last active player from the country's previous World Cup appearance in 1998, become the oldest player ever to appear in a World Cup. Colombia went on to defeated Uruguay 2–0 on 28 June in the round of 16, securing a spot in the quarter-finals for the first time in their history. Colombia then fell to hosts Brazil 2–1 in the quarter-final round in controversy, where media and figures such as Diego Maradona criticized FIFA and Carlos Velasco Carballo for "favoring" Brazil and being biased in disallowing a goal from Mario Yepes and allowing too many fouls by the Brazilians to occur without any yellow cards being shown. Despite the elimination, the national team was greeted by tens of thousands of Colombians in Bogotá, welcoming them back as heroes and restoring pride to the nation. Colombia would then receive the FIFA Fair Play Trophy and have James Rodríguez and Juan Cuadrado end as the World Cup's leading goal scorer and assist leader, respectively.

Colombia had a disappointing 2015 Copa América, having won only a single game during the group stage match against Brazil, with their only goal of the tournament. Colombia would be eliminated by Argentina in the next round via penalty shootout, ending their campaign with one win, two draws, and one loss. Their only goal throughout the tournament was scored by Jeison Murillo, who would later win the tournament's Best Young Player award and be included in the tournament's Star XI. The following year, Colombia began their 2016 Copa América Centenario campaign with a 0–2 victory against hosts United States. Days later they sealed their qualification to the quarter finals with a 2–1 victory against Paraguay. In the final group game however, they fell to Costa Rica 2–3 and finished second in the group following a completely rotated squad. On 17 June, they advanced to the semi-finals with a win against Peru on penalties 4–2 in front of 79,000 fans at MetLife Stadium. Colombia would then lose to eventual tournament winners Chile following mistakes by their defense. Colombia, however, won the third place match against the hosts United States to seal their best result since winning the 2001 edition.

Colombia qualified for the 2018 FIFA World Cup by finishing fourth in CONMEBOL qualifying and drew a challenging group; playing with Japan, Poland and Senegal. The team was nevertheless considered the group favorites, but began their campaign with an unexpected 2–1 controversial defeat to Japan, with Carlos Sánchez being sent off after just three minutes of play. Colombia resurrected their hopes of advancing from the group with a 3–0 win over Poland, whose own chances of advancing were ended with the defeat. After the match, head coach José Pékerman dedicated the win to Carlos Sánchez. On 28 June, Colombia beat Senegal by a scoreline of 1–0, topping their group and advancing into the round of 16, and eliminated Senegal in process as well. On 3 July in Moscow, Colombia were knocked out by England in the round of 16; the game finished 1–1 after extra time, with England winning 4–3 on penalties. Match referee Mark Geiger proved to be controversial, with criticism from both sets of teams. Colombia captain Radamel Falcao and manager José Pékerman both accused Geiger of favouring the England team during the match. Diego Maradona once again claimed favouritism against Colombia, saying, "England's penalty was a terrible call and that the ref won the match for England," and that Colombia were victims of a "monumental robbery". In response, FIFA said Maradona's comments were "entirely inappropriate" and insinuations about the referee "completely unfounded". A FIFA statement read, "Following comments made by Diego Armando Maradona in relation to yesterday's round of 16 game, Colombia vs England, FIFA strongly rebukes the criticism of the performance of the match officials which it considers to have been positive in a tough and highly emotional match. Furthermore, it also considers the additional comments and insinuations made as being entirely inappropriate and completely unfounded." Maradona subsequently apologized to FIFA and its president, admitting some of things he said were unacceptable: "I said a couple of things and, I admit, some of them are unacceptable."

Current era (2019–present) 
Following the federation's choice to not renew Pekerman's contract, former Iran manager Carlos Queiroz was hired to coach the national team. After an impressive 8 goal run, winning 3 out of 4 of their pre-Copa America friendlies as well as conceding only 2 goals in only one, optimism for the Portuguese coach and the team itself was strong.

Starting off their 2019 Copa América campaign, Colombia defeated favorites Argentina in a shocking 2–0 win, marking their first victory over the La Albiceleste since 2007. Days later, they would face a very defensive Asian Cup champions and 2022 World Cup hosts Qatar with a 1–0 victory to become the first team in the group stages to advance to the next round. Colombia would end their group stage run in perfect fashion with a 1–0 victory over Paraguay, resting a majority of their starters and finishing with nine points with four goals scored and none conceded throughout the group stage. Colombia also became the only team since the 2001 edition to advance out of the group stage with a 100% perfect run. Despite this achievement, Colombia was then eliminated by Chile in a penalty shootout during the quarter-finals match where Colombia performed poorly, only to be saved by the referee over two disallowed Chilean goals.

Colombia began the 2022 World Cup qualifiers with hope to make it third in a row for the second time, and Colombia appeared to be on the right path where they beat neighbor Venezuela and held Chile. However, when matches resumed following COVID-19 pandemic, Colombia's performance slipped disastrously, with a 0–3 home loss to Uruguay (its worst ever home loss for 82 years) before being shockingly thrashed 1–6 by Ecuador, marking the end of Carlos Queiroz's reign as Colombia's coach in December 2020. On 14 January 2021, the Colombian Football Federation announced Reinaldo Rueda's return to the national team. He made his returning debut in the match against Peru for the second time in the 2022 FIFA World Cup qualification, having faced the same opponent in the same qualification as coach of Chile. After a break, Colombia managed to defeat Peru again, this time with a 3–0 victory in Lima. Colombia then picked up a valuable point after a 2–2 draw against Argentina in Barranquilla.

In the 2021 Copa América, Colombia started with a 1–0 victory against Ecuador. Days later, they faced Venezuela, where the match ended with a 0–0 draw. Then, they would face Peru, where the first half ended with a victory for Peru with a goal in the 17th minute. In the second half, Colombia was able to tie with a penalty goal for an action by Peruvian goalkeeper Pedro Gallese against Miguel Borja. However, in the 64th minute, a mistake by Yerry Mina caused him to score an own goal after a corner kick by Peru, goalkeeper David Ospina clawed the ball away but the referee ruled the goal valid, ending the match with a score of 1–2. Finally, Colombia faced Brazil, with Luis Díaz scoring the first goal of the match in just 10 minutes into the game, which was considered the best goal of the Copa América by some media and fans. However, in the 78th minute, Brazil scored a controversial goal shortly after the ball touched referee Nestor Pitana, without him stopping play. Brazil scored another goal in the finale minutes of the game, causing the score to end 1–2. Even so, Colombia finished in third place in the Group B table and qualified for the quarterfinals, where they faced Uruguay, where the match was defined with a 4–2 victory for Colombia through penalties after a 0–0 draw. In the semifinals, Colombia contested with Argentina, where they drew 1–1. Argentina won 3–2 in the penalty shoot-out. Colombia managed to win the match for third place against Peru, with the score 3–2, where the last two goals that Luis Díaz scored along with one in the final 93rd minute of the game made him the top scorer of the Copa América, along with Lionel Messi. The third-place victory for Colombia marks their best result since also winning third place in the Copa América Centenario.

After the Copa América, Colombia resumed their 2022 qualification campaign with a 1–1 draw against Bolivia at Estadio Hernando Siles in low oxygen conditions, and a convincing 3–1 win against Chile. However, after the game with Chile, Colombia fell into a goal drought, drawing 0–0 with Uruguay, Brazil and Ecuador consecutively, before losing 1–0 away to Brazil. Colombia again drew goalless with Paraguay, and lost at home 1–0 against Peru, which greatly diminished their hopes for qualifying to the World Cup, since they would have to depend on other results to qualify. Another 1–0 loss to Argentina extended their drought to seven official matches without scoring. In the next two matchdays Colombia finally secured goals, winning 3–0 against Bolivia, and 1–0 against Venezuela on the final matchday. However, due to other results, mainly Paraguay's defeat to Peru, Colombia finished in sixth place and failed to qualify for the World Cup. Rueda left his post as the Colombian team manager shortly after.

Rivalries

Venezuela
Colombia's main geopolitical rival has always been Venezuela. However, the rivalry is historically very one-sided for Colombia. This state of affairs started to change from the late 1990s, when football slowly began replacing baseball as Venezuela's main sport.

In 2001, Coach Luis Garcia was sacked for only managing a draw in an away game in San Cristóbal which ended 2–2 when a victory had been taken for granted. This was just a sign of things to come. Four years later in the 2006 World Cup qualifiers, Venezuela stunned the continent by defeating Colombia in Barranquilla 0–1. The game showed the new direction of the rivalry: while Colombia remains ahead on all rankings and competitions, Venezuela always outperform themselves when meeting each other. Former captain Valderrama started calling the games a "classic" and stated "Venezuela kill themselves [do their best] playing against us."

As of 2021, Colombia has not been able to win on Venezuelan soil since 1996. They would win in Venezuela during 2022 World Cup qualifying which marked their first win in Venezuela since 1996. During Jose Pekerman's coaching for the 2014 FIFA World Cup qualification, considered the rebirth of Colombian football, Venezuela still managed to win their game at home, which was one of only three defeats the Argentinean suffered. Venezuela also won the group stage game against Colombia in the 2015 Copa America which were their only three points, although Colombia still managed to advance to the knockout stage while Venezuela ended last. However, the matches are still not as popular as the rival matches against Argentina.

Argentina

The historical Colombian 5–0 victory in 1993, beating host Argentina in the 1994 World Cup qualifiers, was the very first time Argentina lost in its home stadium Estadio Monumental during a qualifying match for a World Cup. Argentina had come to the qualifiers as a World Cup champion and finalist in the most recent editions (1986 and 1990). It caused a huge upset and start of a respective rivalry. Unlike other rivalries full of hostility, the Colombian–Argentine rivalry is more based on "respect" than a "hated" relationship, always attracting great interest between both nations. After the wane of Valderrama's generation, the rivalry became one-sided again until recent years, when the majority of the games started resulting in draws.

Colombia and Argentina faced each other in ten matches during the past years, with Colombia winning once and Argentina twice, and 7 matches ending in draws. Tensions flourished again in 2021 after the semi final match of the 2021 Copa America, a match which ended in a defeat for Colombia after the penalty shootout when Emiliano Martínez, the Argentinean goalkeeper, utilized provocative gestures and phrases to distract the Colombian players, which were broadcast on live television. The episode sparked widespread controversy and reject from the Colombian side while it was praised from the Argentinian one, adding up to the already heated relationship of the teams.

Brazil

Colombia had a more hostile rivalry against Brazil due to the 2014 FIFA World Cup encounter, where Brazil defeated Colombia 2–1 overshadowed by Neymar's injury and referee's favoritism towards Brazil against Colombia. This would later cause matches between the two national teams to be more intense, aggressive and to a certain extent, played with great hostility with numerous violent incidents, especially during the 2015 Copa América, where Neymar was sent off during a brawl after the final whistle after the Brazilian side suffered defeat, as well during the quarter-final match of the football tournament of the 2016 Summer Olympics between the two teams.

The rivalry would soon improve in a less hostile manner after the 2016 Copa Sudamericana Finals when Atlético Nacional asked CONMEBOL to award the trophy for Associação Chapecoense de Futebol due to the LaMia Flight 2933 crash; Nonetheless, it remains a competitive rivalry between the two which often sparks heated episodes among players of both teams.

Home stadium

Colombia plays their qualifying matches and friendlies at the Estadio Metropolitano Roberto Meléndez in Barranquilla, which is the home stadium of the local football team Atlético Junior. The stadium is named after former Colombia national team player Roberto Meléndez, who is widely considered to be Colombia's best player during the Colombia's amateur era in the 1930s–1940s. Curiously, the stadium was used for all of Colombia's successful qualification campaigns for the World Cups in Italy (1990), United States (1994), France (1998). Additionally, the venue was used for the qualification process for Germany (2006), where Colombia were unsuccessful. However, it hosted the qualification matches for the 2014 and 2018 FIFA World Cups, where Colombia returned to the World Cup finals after a 16-year absence.

The Estadio Nemesio Camacho El Campín in the capital city of Bogotá acts as the national team's alternative stadium. The stadium is the playing ground of local clubs Millonarios and Santa Fe. Notably, El Campín is remembered for hosting Colombia's 2001 Copa América final against Mexico, where the team achieved its first international trophy after winning the match 1–0.

Team image

Traditionally, Colombia's home colours are yellow shirts with navy trim and navy or white shorts and socks, with their away colours being normally navy shirts. They wore their first ever red kit at the 2014 FIFA World Cup. Colombia used red as their home colours in the 20th century, although in Copa América Centenario the team played in an all-white kit for the first time in their history, before reverting to the yellow and navy kit thereafter.

Kit sponsorship

Results and fixtures

2022

2023

Coaching staff

Players

Current squad
The following 25 players were called up for the friendly matches against South Korea and Japan on 24 and 28 March 2023.

Caps and goals updated as of 28 January 2023, after the match against United States.

Recent call-ups
The following players have also been called up in the last twelve months.

INJ Withdrew due to injury
PRE Preliminary squad
COV Withdrew due to COVID-19
RET Retired from the national team
SUS Suspended

Individual records

Players in bold are still active with Colombia.

Most capped players

Most capped goalkeepers

Top goalscorers

Competitive record

FIFA World Cup

1.Played Intercontinental playoffs.

Copa América

 Champions   Runners-up   Third place   Fourth place

FIFA Confederations Cup

Head-to-head record

Below is a result summary of all matches Colombia have played against FIFA recognized teams.

Honours

Titles
 South American Championship / Copa América
 Champions: 2001
 Runners-up: 1975
 Third place: 1987, 1993, 1995, 2016, 2021
 Fourth place: 1991, 2004
 FIFA Confederations Cup
 Fourth place: 2003
 CONCACAF Gold Cup
 Runners-up: 2000
 Fourth place: 2005

Friendlies
 Copa Centenario de Armenia
 Winners: 1989
 Los Angeles Cup:
 Winners: 1990

Olympic and Pan American Team
 Pan American Games:
  Silver Medalists (1): 1971
  Bronze Medalists (1): 1995
 Central American and Caribbean Games
  Gold Medalists (3): 1946, 2006, 2018
  Silver Medalists (1): 2014
  Bronze Medalists (3): 1938, 1954, 1970
 South American Games:
  Gold Medalists (3): 1994, 2010, 2014
  Silver Medalists (1): 1986
  Bronze Medalists (2): 1990, 2018
 Bolivarian Games
  Gold Medalists (5): 1951, 1997, 2005, 2013, 2017
  Silver Medalists (6): 1961, 1973, 1981, 1985, 1993, 2001

Awards
 FIFA World Cup Fair Play Trophy
 Winners: 2014

See also

 Colombia Olympic football team
 Colombia national under-20 football team
 Colombia national under-17 football team
 Colombia national under-15 football team
 Colombia national futsal team

References

External links

  
 Colombia profile – FIFA.com
 Archive of results 1938– at RSSSF
 International matches of Colombia during the Era Bilardo of 1980–1981 at RSSSF

 
South American national association football teams
1938 establishments in Colombia
Football in Colombia